Daria Egorova (born 23 February 1996) is a Russian former professional racing cyclist. She rode in the women's road race at the 2015 UCI Road World Championships.

Major results
Source: 

2014
 1st  Individual pursuit, UEC European Junior Track Championships
 National Junior Road Championships
2nd Road race
3rd Time trial
 UEC European Junior Road Championships
3rd  Road race
4th Time trial
 10th Time trial, UCI Junior Road World Championships
2015
 3rd Road race, National Road Championships

References

External links

1996 births
Living people
Russian female cyclists
Place of birth missing (living people)